Whitehead may refer to:

 Whitehead, a blocked sweat/sebaceous duct of the skin known medically as a closed comedo.
 Whitehead (bird), a small species of passerine bird, endemic to New Zealand.
 Whitehead building, heritage listed residence of the principal of the University of Adelaide's Lincoln College.
 Whitehead (patience), a patience game related to Klondike.
 Whitehead (surname), a surname.
 Whitehead torpedo, the first effective self-propelled torpedo, invented by Robert Whitehead in 1866.
 Whiteheads, another name for the wheat disease take-all.
 USS Whitehead (1861–1865), American Civil War, 136-ton screw steam gunboat.

Places
 Canada:
 The Rural Municipality of Whitehead, Manitoba
 Whitehead, Nova Scotia, on Tor Bay
 Hong Kong
 Whitehead, Hong Kong, a cape at Wu Kai Sha
 Northern Ireland
 Whitehead, County Antrim, a small town in Northern Ireland
 United States:
 Cape Whitehead, Cumberland County, Maine 43.3844N 70.1131W
 Lake Whitehead reservoir, Napa County, California 38.3529N 122.2755W 
 Whitehead, Alabama, Lauderdale County, Alabama 34.5317N 87.1938W 
 Whitehead, Mississippi (Tallahatchie County) 33.5055N 90.1755W 
 Whitehead Township, Alleghany County, North Carolina 36.2802N 81.0910W
 Whitehead, Tennessee, Marshall County, Tennessee 35.2848N 86.4719W 
 Whitehead, Texas, Hunt County, Texas 32.5205N 96.1536W 
 Whitehead Island, Knox County, Maine